The Wicht Club was an irreverent, self-assembling society of Harvard University lecturers. From 1903 to 1911 it met monthly for informal dialogue to advance the members' scientific thought and expression. Today it would be seen as a professional development organization, but this group had its mascot (Das Wicht) and other terms:
Wichts : members
Wichtinnen : members' wives
Was Wichtiges : annual binding of members' scientific reprints

Meetings
The club met at a restaurant or hotel in Boston, going outside the stifling 
atmosphere of academic or domestic spaces. Records were not kept of the ordinary 
monthly meetings where a presentation may be interrupted or supplemented by 
audience comments. According to Frederick Parker Gay, "guests were invited, among them 
William James several times." Once a year the wives were invited to join the 
Wicht Club when the new volume of Was Wichtiges was presented. "The nine 
volumes … are a treasure trove of the work produced by young Harvard scientists and 
philosophers at the beginning of the twentieth century."

Members
Elmer Ernest Southard, psychiatry
Walter B. Cannon, physiology
G. W. Pierce, physics
Ralph Barton Perry, philosophy
Gilbert N. Lewis, chemistry
Robert M. Yerkes, primate biology
Edwin Holt, psychology
Harry W. Morse, physics
Roswell P. Angien, psychology
Wilmon H. Sheldon, philosophy

Origin
Boston society was largely organized around social clubs. To assert themselves socially, these young lecturers without access to the exclusive clubs of Boston families, formed their own club.

When G. W. Pierce and Harry W. Morse returned from their post-doctoral studies and 
travels in Europe, Pierce carried with him a copy of the German humor magazine 
Simplicissimus. A certain drawing of a gnome between the spreading roots of a 
great tree was labeled "Das Wicht". Any student of German knows that "Wichtigkeit" 
means "importance", but the root "Wicht" left room for these Harvard men to exercise 
themselves together in an unfettered way.

Notes

References
 W. B. Cannon (1945) The Way of an Investigator, A Scientist's Experiences in Medical Research, WW Norton, NY, pages 175-6.

Clubs and societies in Boston
History of Harvard University
1903 establishments in Massachusetts
1911 disestablishments in Massachusetts